Sebastian Florian Hönig (born 1978) is a German astronomer, Professor of Observational & Computational Astrophysics (and Head of School elect) in the astronomy group of the University of Southampton School of Physics & Astronomy, and discoverer of minor planets and comets.

Career and research 
Hönig works on the theory and observations of active galactic nuclei (AGN), dust tori and dusty winds. He received his PhD (Dr. rer. nat.) from the University of Bonn with work carried our in the Infrared Interferometry group at the Max Planck Institute for Radio Astronomy. During this time he developed a new Radiative transfer to interpret infrared observations of AGN. In 2010, Hönig received a DFG Fellowship and moved to the University of California, Santa Barbara working with Robert Antonucci. During this time, he used VLTI observations of two Seyfert galaxies to show that dusty winds contribute significantly to the infrared radiation from these objects. Hönig received a Marie Skłodowska-Curie (2014) and an ERC Starting Grant (2015) at the University of Southampton to study this phenomena in more detail.

He is involved in the development of instruments for the Paranal Observatory of the European Southern Observatory (ESO). Hönig is Co-Investigator of GRAVITY+, an upgrade to the GRAVITY instrument. He is member of the Time Domain Extragalactic Survey (TiDES) using the 4MOST instrument at ESO's VISTA telescope and leads the AGN reverberation mapping sub-survey.

Comets and minor planets 
Hönig has identified numerous asteroids and correctly identified the periodic comet P/2007 R5 despite it having no tail. On 22 July 2002, he discovered comet C/2002 O4 and is credited by the MPC with the discovery of 560 numbered minor plantes during 2001–2008.

On 7 January 2004, the outer main-belt asteroid 51983 Hönig, discovered by Charles Juels and Paulo R. Holvorcem in 2001, was named in his honor.

List of discovered minor planets

See also 
 List of minor planet discoverers

References

External links 
 Homepage of Sebastian Hönig
 Identification of a new short-period comet near the sun, Sebastian F. Hoenig, arXiv:astro-ph/0509168
 MPEC 2002-O45 : COMET C/2002 O4 (HOENIG)
 SOHO Mission Discovers Rare Comet
 Astronomers Spot New Halley-Like Comet
 SOHO's new catch: its first officially periodic comet

1978 births
Discoverers of comets
Discoverers of minor planets

21st-century German astronomers
Living people
Academics of the University of Southampton